Notable people from Palai include:

Politicians
 K. R. Narayanan, President of India (1997–2002), Vice-President of India (1992–97).
 Jose K. Mani Member of Indian Parliament - Lok Sabha (2010-Continuing).
 N M Joseph, Minister of Forests, Kerala State (1987–91)
 M M Jacob, Member of Parliament (Rajya Sabha) (1981-1993), Deputy Chairman of Rajya Sabha (1986–87), Union Minister of Parliamentary Affairs, Home (1987–93), State Governor of Meghalaya (1995–2007).
 Kidangoor Gopalakrishna Pillai, General Secretary of NSS (1967 onwards) and Indian High-Commissioner to Singapore (1992 onwards).
 P K Vasudevan Nair, Member of Parliament, Chief Minister of Kerala State.
 K M Chandy, State Governor (1982–89), President of Kerala Pradesh Congress Committee (I).
 Cherian J. Kappan, Freedom Fighter, Member of Indian Parliament - Lok Sabha (1962–67). Municipal Chairman.
 George Thomas Kottukapally, Member of Indian Parliament - Lok Sabha (1957–62), U.N. Delegate.
 R V Thomas, President (Speaker) of Travancore State Legislative Assembly (1947–49).
 Dr P J Thomas, Member of Madras Legislative Council, 1937–42 and Member of Indian Parliament - Rajya Sabha 1957-62.
 Ulahannan Ulahannan Vadakkan, Member of Sree Moolam Popular Assembly of Travancore State (1912–31).
 J Thomas Kayalackakom, Member of Sree Moolam Popular Assembly of Travancore State (1922–28).

Literature, education and social service
Aryambika S. V., Malayalam poet.
 Paremmakkal Thoma Kathanar: Author of "Varthamana Pusthakam", the first travelogue in an Indian language.
 Ramapurathu Warrier - Poet (Kuchelavritham).
 Kattakayam Cherian Mappillai (1859–1936) - Author of Sri Yesu Vijayam (1926) & Editor of Vijnaana Rathnaakaram (1913)
 Pala Narayanan Nair, poet, teacher, most celebrated work 'keralam valarunnu'
 Pravithanam PM Devasia, poet
 Lalithambika Antharjanam, novelist
 Fr. Abel Periapuram, Founder of Kalabhavan.
 Paul Zacharia, writer & columnist
 Ezhacherry Ramachandran, poet
 Bishop Sebastian Vayalil, Founder of St. Thomas College
 Cyriac Thomas, former Vice Chancellor

Government and administration
 V. Joseph Thomas IPS, Director General of Police, Kerala.
 V. J. Kurian IAS, Addl. Chief Secretary to Govt. of Kerala. Managing Director of the World's First Solar Powered Airport 
 B. Sandhya IPS, writer and police officer.

Sports
 Col. G.V. Raja, sports promoter
 M D Valsamma, athletics, Asian Games Gold Medalist
 Mani C. Kappan international volleyball player

Commerce and industry
 Joseph Augusti Kayalackakom (1884–1968) - Founder Managing Director of Palai Central Bank.

Movies
 Bhadran, movie director
 Miss Kumari,  Malayalam actress in leading roles
 Suvarna Mathew, actress
 Ponnamma Babu, actress
 Pala Thankam, actress
 Miya (Gimi George), actress
 Mani C. Kappan, director, producer, actor
 Rimi Tomy, singer
 Listin Stephen, film producer
 Chali Pala, actor

Journalists 
 Jose Panachippuram, associate editor, Malayala Manorama daily
 Eby J Jose, editor, Gulf Life magazine

References

People from Pala, Kerala